Jonathan Guadarrama (born March 5, 1999) is an American soccer player who plays as a left-back for Chattanooga Red Wolves SC in USL League One.

Career

Youth
Guadarrma attended Logan High School, also playing for various club teams including; The Aggies, La Roca, Northern Utah United and Infinity, before joining the Real Salt Lake academy.

College & Amateur
In 2017, Guadarrama attended Salt Lake Community College, going on to make 19 appearances, scoring eight goals and tallying eight assists over two seasons with the Bruins. Guadarrama completed a third college season, playing at the University of Montevallo and making 16 appearances and scoring three goals for the Falcons.

In 2019 and 2021, Guadarrama also played in the USL League Two for Park City Red Wolves.

Professional
On January 19, 2022, Guadarrama signed with USL League One club Chattanooga Red Wolves ahead of their 2022 season. He made his professional debut on April 6, 2022, appearing as an 85th–minute substitute during a 1–0 loss to Louisville City FC in the Lamar Hunt U.S. Open Cup.

References

External links
 Chattanooga Red Wolves profile

1999 births
Living people
American soccer players
Association football defenders
Chattanooga Red Wolves SC players
People from Logan, Utah
Soccer players from Utah
USL League One players
USL League Two players